NBA Sunday Showcase on ABC is a series of Sunday afternoon broadcasts of National Basketball Association (NBA) games that are produced by ESPN and televised on the American Broadcasting Company (ABC).  From 2018-2020 and 2022–present, the Sunday Showcase season always began on Super Bowl Sunday.
However in 2021, due to the delay to the start of the season, the season of Sunday Showcase started 2 weeks after Super Bowl Sunday on February 21, 2021.

Games and results

2022–2023

2021–2022

2020–2021

2019–2020

2018–2019

2017–2018

2016–2017

2015–2016

2014–2015

2013–2014

2012–2013

2011–2012

2010–2011

2009–2010

References

External links
ESPN's official website for coverage of the NBA

2000s American television series
2010s American television series
ABC Sports
American Broadcasting Company original programming
ABC